David Armitage
Sir John Baker
Peter J. Barnes
Sir Jonathan Bate
Sir Alan Battersby
Charles Benstead
Arnoldus Schytte Blix
Asa Briggs, Baron Briggs
Sir Graeme Davies
Sir Terence English
Kai T. Erikson
Rona Fairhead
Richard Gardner
Simon Gaunt
Sir Peter Hall
David Harding
Joanne Harris
Nigel Hess
Charles Higham
Sir Peter Hirsch
David Ingram
Sir Emyr Jones Parry
Sir Harvey McGrath
Sir Ian McKellen
Yuri Oganessian
Sir Geoffrey Pattie
Jeremy Paxman
Sir Michael Peckham
Sir Nicholas Penny
John Shelton Reed
Robert Saxton
Helen Small
Richard Smethurst
Sarah Springman
Barry Supple
Sir Peter Swinnerton-Dyer
Dame Jean Thomas
Daniella Tilbury
James Wright

References

 Honorary Fellows

St Catharine's College, Cambridge
Fellows of St Catharine's College, Cambridge
Saint Catharine's College